Katja Marika Makaroff is a Finnish producer and creative director. She is the CCO of Gutsy Animations. She was the creative director in Fremantle Media and Filmlance International and the CEO in Fremantle Media Finland and Friday TV.

She produced Finnish versions of TV shows such as The Apprentice, Dragons Den, Idols, Top Model and X Factor. She has also produced drama and sold content to over 70 countries. Marika won the Silver one award for branded content in 2011 for her format Buy this.

Marika is the executive producer and creative director of the TV-series Moominvalley that premiered in 2019. The series' first episode was the most watched program on Finnish national broadcaster Yle's streaming service, Yle Areena.

Career 
Marika became known for there work as a journalist in both television and radio. She worked series such as Jyrki, Wild bunch and Under construction Finland. In 2003 she led the series Makaroff & Modig, a political talk show she hosted together with journalist Silvia Modig. In 2005 Marika became the CEO of Fremantle Media Finland. In 2011 she became the Creative director of the company, overseeing all creative development in the Nordics. In 2014 she moved to Stockholm to become the CEO of Friday TV. In 2015 she became the creative director of Filmlance international, that is known for creating original format of the TV-series The Bridge.

In 2016 Makaroff launched the production company Gutsy Animations together with co-founder Aram Aflatuni. Gutsy Animations aims to create global and high quality content, that is above all meaningful. 

Marika is the creative director and executive producer in an animated TV-series Moominvalley. The series is based on the beloved Moomin books and comics by the Finnish author and illustrator Tove Jansson. The series, directed by Oscar winner Steve Box (2006 Best Animation feature Wallace and Gromit: Curse of the were-rabbit).

Moominvalley premiered in spring 2019. The first episode of Moominvalley was viewed by 600,000 viewers when it premiered in Finland's Yle TV2 in February 2019. It also became the most watched television series episode of all time in Yle's streaming service, Yle Areena, bringing the total viewership of the first episode in Finland to over two million.

In 2019 Moominvalley was awarded the Best Animated Kid's Programme at TBI's Content Innovation Awards. The series also won a Golden Venla award for 2019 Best Children's Program.

References

Living people
Finnish producers
Year of birth missing (living people)